The Maravilha Environmental Protection Area is a municipal environmental protection area in the state of Rio de Janeiro, Brazil.

Location

The Maravilha Environmental Protection Area (APA) is in the municipality of São José do Vale do Rio Preto, Rio de Janeiro.
The Serra da Maravilha is one of the main conservation areas in the municipality along with the Serra do Taquaruçu (Araponga Municipal Nature Park) and Pedra das Flores Natural Monument.
A dam located in the APA is the main source of water for the town.
The APA contains a water treatment station.

The Maravilha APA contains alpine meadows and secondary growth forest, surrounded by agricultural land and pastures.
Some of the agricultural activities are irregular, and the farmers extract firewood from the APA improperly.
The APA includes large farms and conventional horticulture, and is poorly managed.

History 

The Maravilha Environmental Protection Area was created by municipal decree 1.652 of 5 June 2006.
It is administered by the Secretaria Municipal de Meio Ambiente.
The purpose is to ensure the conservation and sustainable use of natural resources.
It was included in the Central Rio de Janeiro Atlantic Forest Mosaic, created in December 2006.
As of 2010 there was no management plan.
The drought in 2014 caused low water in the dam, leading to supply of water from contaminated streams in the region.
This in turn created health problems, particularly with children.

Notes

Sources

2006 establishments in Brazil
Environmental protection areas of Brazil
Protected areas of Rio de Janeiro (state)